Time's Arrow is the seventh studio album by English electronic music band Ladytron. It was released on January 20, 2023, via the label Cooking Vinyl.

Singles
Time's Arrow was supported by three singles. The first single, "City of Angels" was released on October 14, 2022. It was accompanied by a music video directed by Manuel Nogueira that was released on October 26. "Misery Remember Me" was the second single and was released on November 11, 2022. The third single, "Faces" was released on December 5, 2022, and accompanied by a music video released on January 17, 2023.

Track listing

Reception
The music review website Pitchfork gave Time's Arrow a rating of 6.9 and described it as "capturing the passage of time in effervescent synths and impressionistic lyrics." Metacritic, which uses a weighted average, assigned the album a score of 77 out of 100, based on 10 critics, indicating "generally favorable reviews". Thomas Frenken of electrozombies.com gave the album 3.4 stars out of 5 in a January 25, 2023 review.

References

2023 albums
Ladytron albums